Below is the list of populated places in Edirne Province, Turkey by the districts. In the following lists first place in each list is the administrative center of the district.

Edirne 

Edirne	
Ahı, Edirne
Avarız, Edirne
Bosna, Edirne
Budakdoğanca, Edirne
Büyükdöllük, Edirne
Büyükismailçe, Edirne
Değirmenyeni, Edirne
Demirhanlı, Edirne
Doyran, Edirne
Ekmekçi, Edirne
Elçili, Edirne
Eskikadın, Edirne
Hacıumur, Edirme
Hasanağa, Edirne
Hatip, Edirne
Hıdırağa, Edirne
İskender, Edirne
Karabulut, Edirne
Karakasım, Edirne
Karayusuf, Edirne
Kayapa, Edirne
Kemal, Edirne
Korucu, Edirne
Köşençiftliği, Edirne
Küçükdöllük, Edirne
Menekşesofular, Edirne
Muratçalı, Edirne
Musabeyli, Edirne
Orhaniye, Edirne
Sarayakpınar, Edirne
Sazlıdere, Edirne
Suakacağı, Edirne
Tayakadın, Edirne
Uzgaç, Edirne
Üyüklütatar, Edirne
Yenikadın, Edirne
Yolüstü, Edirne

Enez 

Enez	
Abdurrahim, Enez
Büyükevren, Enez
Çandır, Enez
Çavuşköy, Enez
Çeribaşı, Enez
Gülçavuş, Enez
Hasköy, Enez
Hisarlı, Enez
Işıklı, Enez
Karaincirli, Enez
Kocaali, Enez
Küçükevren, Enez
Sultaniçe, Enez
Sütçüler, Enez
Şehitler, Enez
Umurbey, Enez
Vakıf, Enez
Yazır, Enez
Yenice, Enez

Havsa	

Havsa	
Abalar, Havsa
Arpaç, Havsa
Azatlı, Havsa
Bakışlar, Havsa
Bostanlı, Havsa
Çukurköy, Havsa
Habiller, Havsa
Hasköy, Havsa
Kabaağaç, Havsa
Köseömer, Havsa
Kulubalık, Havsa
Kuzucu, Havsa
Musulca, Havsa
Naipyusuf, Havsa
Necatiye, Havsa
Oğulpaşa, Havsa
Osmanlı, Havsa
Söğütlüdere, Havsa
Şerbettar, Havsa
Tahal, Havsa
Taptık, Havsa
Yolageldi, Havsa

İpsala	

İpsala	
Ahır, İpsala
Aliçopehlivan, İpsala
Balabancık, İpsala
Esetçe, İpsala
Hacı, İpsala
Hıdırköy, İpsala
İbriktepe, İpsala
Karaağaç, İpsala
Kocahıdır, İpsala
Korucu, İpsala
Koyuntepe, İpsala
Kumdere, İpsala
Küçükdoğanca, İpsala
Paşaköy, İpsala
Pazardere, İpsala
Sarıcaali, İpsala
Sarpdere, İpsala
Sultan, İpsala
Tevfikiye, İpsala
Turpçular, İpsala
Yapıldak, İpsala
Yenikarpuzlu, İpsala

Keşan 

Keşan	
Akçeşme, Keşan
Akhoca, Keşan
Altıntaş, Keşan
Bahçeköy, Keşan
Barağı, Keşan
Beğendik, Keşan
Beyköy, Keşan
Boztepe, Keşan
Büyükdoğanca, Keşan
Çamlıca, Keşan
Çelebi, Keşan
Çeltik, Keşan
Çobançeşmesi, Keşan
Danişment, Keşan
Dişbudak, Keşan
Erikli, Keşan
Gökçetepe, Keşan
Gündüzler, Keşan
İzzetiye, Keşan
Kadıköy, Keşan
Karacaali, Keşan
Karahisar, Keşan
Karasatı, Keşan
Karlı, Keşan
Kılıçköy, Keşan
Kızkapan, Keşan
Koruklu, Keşan
Kozköy, Keşan
Küçükdoğanca, Keşan
Lalacık, Keşan
Mahmutköy, Keşan
Maltepe, Keşan
Mecidiye, Keşan
Mercan, Keşan
Orhaniye, Keşan
Paşayiğit, Keşan
Pırnar, Keşan
Sazlıdere, Keşan
Seydiköy, Keşan
Siğilli, Keşan
Suluca, Keşan
Şabanmera, Keşan
Şükrüköy, Keşan
Türkmen, Keşan
Yaylaköy, Keşan
Yeniceçiftlik, Keşan
Yenimuhacir, Keşan
Yerlisu, Keşan
Yeşilköy, Keşan

Lalapaşa 

Lalapaşa	
Büyünlü, Lalapaşa
Çallıdere, Lalapaşa
Çatma, Lalapaşa
Çömlek, Lalapaşa
Çömlekakpınar, Lalapaşa
Demirköy, Lalapaşa
Doğanköy, Lalapaşa
Dombay, Lalapaşa
Hacıdanişment, Lalapaşa
Hacılar, Lalapaşa
Hamzabeyli, Lalapaşa
Hanlıyenice, Lalapaşa
Hüseyinpınar, Lalapaşa
Kalkansöğüt, Lalapaşa
Kavaklı, Lalapaşa
Küçünlü, Lalapaşa
Ortakçı, Lalapaşa
Ömeroba, Lalapaşa
Saksağan, Lalapaşa
Sarıdanişment, Lalapaşa
Sinanköy, Lalapaşa
Süleymandanişment, Lalapaşa
Taşlımüsellim, Lalapaşa
Tuğlalık, Lalapaşa
Uzunbayır, Lalapaşa
Vaysal, Lalapaşa
Yünlüce, Lalapaşa

Meriç 

Meriç	
Adasarhanlı, Meriç
Akçadam, Meriç
Akıncılar, Meriç
Alibey, Meriç
Büyükaltıağaç, Meriç
Hasırcıarnavut, Meriç
Kadıdondurma, Meriç
Karahamza, Meriç
Karayusuflu, Meriç
Kavaklı, Meriç
Küçükaltıağaç, Meriç
Küpdere, Meriç
Küplü, Meriç
Nasuhbey, Meriç
Olacak, Meriç
Paşayenice, Meriç
Rahmanca, Meriç
Saatağacı, Meriç
Serem, Meriç
Subaşı, Meriç
Umurca, Meriç
Yakupbey, Meriç
Yenicegörüce, Meriç

Süloğlu	 

Süloğlu
Akardere, Süloğlu
Büyük Gerdelli, Süloğlu
Domurcalı, Süloğlu
Geçkinli, Süloğlu
Keramettin, Süloğlu
Küküler, Süloğlu
Sülecik, Süloğlu
Taşlısekban, Süloğlu
Tatarlar, Süloğlu
Yağcılı, Süloğlu

Uzunköprü 

Uzunköprü	
Alıç, Uzunköprü
Altınyazı, Uzunköprü
Aslıhan, Uzunköprü
Balaban, Uzunköprü
Balabankoru, Uzunköprü
Başağıl, Uzunköprü
Bayramlı, Uzunköprü
Beykonak, Uzunköprü
Bıldır, Uzunköprü
Çakmak, Uzunköprü
Çalı, Uzunköprü
Çavuşlu, Uzunköprü
Çiftlik, Uzunköprü
Çobanpınar, Uzunköprü
Danişment, Uzunköprü
Değirmenci, Uzunköprü
Dereköy, Uzunköprü
Elmalı, Uzunköprü
Eskiköy, Uzunköprü
Gazimehmet, Uzunköprü
Gemici, Uzunköprü
Hamidiye, Uzunköprü
Hamitli, Uzunköprü
Harmanlı, Uzunköprü
Hasanpınar, Uzunköprü
Kadıağılı, Uzunköprü
Kadıköy, Uzunköprü
Karabürçek, Uzunköprü
Karapınar, Uzunköprü
Karayayla, Uzunköprü
Kavacık, Uzunköprü
Kavakayazma, Uzunköprü
Kırcasalih, Uzunköprü
Kırkkavak, Uzunköprü
Kırköy, Uzunköprü
Kiremitçisalih, Uzunköprü
Kurdu, Uzunköprü
Kurtbey, Uzunköprü
Kurttepe, Uzunköprü
Maksutlu, Uzunköprü
Malkoç, Uzunköprü
Meşeli, Uzunköprü
Muhacırkadı, Uzunköprü
Ömerbey, Uzunköprü
Saçlımüsellim, Uzunköprü
Salarlı, Uzunköprü
Sazlımalkoç, Uzunköprü
Sığırcılı, Uzunköprü
Sipahi, Uzunköprü
Sultanşah, Uzunköprü
Süleymaniye, Uzunköprü
Turnacı, Uzunköprü
Türkobası, Uzunköprü
Yağmurca, Uzunköprü

References 

List
Edirne